KSDI may refer to:

 KSDI-LD, a defunct low-power television station (channel 44, virtual 33) formerly licensed to serve Fresno, California, United States
 KGOF-LD, a low-power television station (channel 33) licensed to serve Fresno, California, which held the call sign KSDI-LP from 1997 to 2016